Bonnie Gallanter is a music manager and the President/CEO of Muse Artist Management.

Career
Her clients include and have included Hollywood Records and the WB's "Summerland" superstar Jesse McCartney (ended 2007), "Making The Band 3's" Denosh, Speed Racer co-star Paulie Litt, Second Nature, Disney's T-Squad, Sugar Beats and 4 time #1, Billboard Award-winning songwriter/producer Eddie Galan of Mach 1 Music. In addition, Bonnie has also managed The Broadway Kids, distributed by Koch Records, for the past 14 years. Broadway Kids alumni include but are not limited to: Ashley Tisdale (High School Musical star), Andrea Bowen (Desperate Housewives), Christy Carlson Romano (Kim Possible, Even Stevens), and Lacey Chabert (Mean Girls, Party of Five).

Bonnie Gallanter was also the Vice President of the Sugar Beats record label.
Sugar Beats have developed into one of the most popular kids' acts around. Their four albums have sold more than one million units on their own Sugar Beats label.

References

External links
 Bonnie Gallanter Official Myspace Website

Living people
Talent managers
Year of birth missing (living people)